The BTR-80 is an 8×8 wheeled amphibious armoured personnel carrier (APC) designed in the USSR. It was adopted in 1985 and replaced the previous vehicles, the BTR-60 and BTR-70, in the Soviet Army. It was first deployed during the Soviet–Afghan War.

The BTR-80 was developed into the larger BTR-90.

Description
The Soviets based the BTR-80 on the BTR-70 APC, which itself was based on the BTR-60. It has a single 260-hp V-8 turbocharged water-cooled diesel engine, an improvement over the twin gasoline engines installed in the BTR-60 and BTR-70 vehicles. The reconfigured rear portion of the hull accommodates the new, single engine. The Soviets removed the roof chamfers of the modified BTR-70, raised the rear, and squared off the rearward-sloping engine compartment.

Standard equipment includes TNPO vision blocks, TNP-B and TKN-3 optical devices for the driver and commander, an OU-3GA2M infrared search light, six 81 mm smoke grenade launchers 902V "Tucha", a radioset (R-173 or R-163-50U), an intercom, and hydrojets for amphibious propulsion.

Capabilities

The Soviets modified the truncated cone turret used on the BTR-70 for the BTR-80 by redesigning the mantlet. This allows the  KPVT and coaxial  PKT machine guns to be elevated to a maximum of 60 degrees. This high angle of fire is useful in engaging targets on steep slopes, in urban fighting, and for engaging low slow flying air targets.

The Soviets modified the design and positioning of the firing ports. The ports are now round rather than tear-shaped, and have ball mounts similar to those used on the BMP-1. The forward firing ports now sit in angled recesses, which allows infantry to fire to the front of the vehicle.

The redesigned side doors are split horizontally. The upper portion opens forward. This gives dismounting troops some protection against small arms fire from the front of the vehicle. The lower portion opens down, forming a step. Six smoke grenade projectors are mounted on the rear of the turret.

The BTR-80 can climb a slope with up to 60% gradient and climb a vertical step of 0.5 m.

Remakes

In 1984, the Soviets began production of a diesel-engined variant of the BTR-70, which they called the BTR-80. The Soviets have retrofitted some BTR-70s with several of the improvements incorporated into the BTR-80, including the high-angle-of-fire turret. The twin doors are designed to allow the infantry to disembark while the vehicle is in motion, and allow the infantry inside to exit from one side if the other is receiving fire.

The 30mm Cannon variants are effective against most targets apart from main battle tanks, against which they can still cause significant damage to optics, weapons, and important systems. The main gun is not stabilized, so accurate fire on the move is limited to low speeds. The turret's rotation mechanism is manually operated.

The gunner sits in a roof-mounted chair located above the flat floor behind the driver/commander and two passengers, and before the passenger bench. The gunner's station is basic, but uncharacteristically spacious for a Soviet armored vehicle. The gunner is equipped with both a day time optical sight and an infrared night sight.

Operational history
The BTR-80 and BTR-82A took part in the 2022 Russian invasion of Ukraine. As of 28 January 2023, Russia was allegedly confirmed by Oryx to have lost 397 BTR-82As (250 destroyed, 9 damaged, 12 abandoned and 126 captured) and 153 BTR-80s (including 85 destroyed, 1 damaged, 4 abandoned and 63 captured). Another 45 BTR-80/BTR-82As were also destroyed or abandoned, but their models cannot be determined.

Variants

Russia

 BTR-80 (GAZ-5903) – armored personnel carrier.
 BTR-80K (GAZ-59031) (kommandnyj) – command vehicle APC with telescopic antenna mast, TNA-4 navigation device and R-163-50У series of radio equipment.
 BTR-80M – an improved model with a 240 hp DMZ-238M2 engine, a slightly longer hull and new tires. In production since 1993. It is understood that only a small number were produced until the original engine was ready for production again.
 BTR-80A (GAZ-59034) – IFV (See pictures) with a 2A72 30 mm gun and 300 rounds as the primary weapon. The turret is called BPPU and is equipped with sights 1PZ-9 (day) and TPN-3 or TPN-3-42 "Kristall" (night). In production and service since 1994.
 BTR-80S – variant of the BTR-80A for the Internal Troops of the MVD, equipped with a KPVT 14.5-mm machine gun and 7.62 mm PKT in the turret.
 BTR-80AK – A command variant of the BTR-80A, with two whip antennas in the rear corners and with only one firing port on the right hull side.
 BRDM-3 (bronirovannaya razvedivatel’no-dozornaya mashina) – An armoured reconnaissance/surveillance vehicle, based on the BTR-80AK and with a new day/night vision device in front of the commander's position. The crew consists of six men. Note that in some Western sources, the name BRDM-3 is incorrectly used for the 9P148 ATGM carrier.
 BTR-82 – the latest production version with improved armour, spall liners, more modern night vision device TKN-4GA, GLONASS navigation system and a more powerful 300 hp engine. The original armament is retained but is now installed in the BPPU turret of the BTR-80A/BTR-82A. The BTR-82 prototype was shown for the first time in November 2009.
 BTR-82A – the latest production version with improved armour, spall liners, a more modern night vision device TKN-4GA-02, 2A72 30 mm gun (a lighter, less complex cousin of the 2A42), GLONASS navigation system and a more powerful 300 hp engine. The prototype of the BTR-82A was shown for the first time in November 2009. The Russian Ministry of Defense adopted the BTR-82A in early 2013. In a Syrian government TV channel report, a BTR-82A was seen in battle in Syria around September 2015. The video showed BTR-82A crew members speaking Russian. It is widely believed that Russian armoured vehicle units were directly fighting anti-government groups in Syria. Russia integrated the AU-220M Baikal remote turret to the BTR-82A fitted with an autocannon firing the 57x348SR mm shells at 120 rpm. The type tests of the updated BTR-82A armored personnel carrier have successfully been completed as of April 2019. Since 2019, all vehicles of the type will receive additional protection and a new fire control system with a thermal imager. More ordered in August 2022.
 BTR-82AM – A refurbished BTR-80 to the level of BTR-82A. Distinguished by a closed (welded) embrasure in the frontal part of the vehicle. The first batch was delivered in 2013. Used by naval infantry.
 BTR-87 – A modification of the BTR-82A that relocates the engine compartment to the front-right part of the hull, allowing troops to disembark through rear and roof hatches.
 BTR-82V – A BTR-80 with a hull upgraded to the BTR-82A-level with 14.5 mm heavy machine gun in a manned turret. Development in accordance with terms issued by the Russian National Guard.

 2S23 "Nona-SVK" – fire support vehicle with the 120 mm 2A60 rifled gun-mortar – developed on the base of 2А51 rifled gun/mortar of the 2S9 Nona – and a crew of 4. Adopted in 1990.

 BREM-K (GAZ-59033) (bronirovannaya remontno-evakuatsionnaya mashina) – armoured recovery vehicle with towbars, a winch, welding equipment and a light crane.
 KM-80 or BTR-80 PBKM – command vehicle.
 RKhM-4 (razvedivatel’naya khimicheskaya mashina) – NBC reconnaissance vehicle with detection devices including the IMD-21BA and DP-5V, an automatic chemical alarm system GSA-12, a detection set for chemical agents KPKhR-3, an MK-3M meteo set, a KPO-1 sampling device, an ASP automatic detector and a KZO-2 flag dispenser to mark contaminated areas.
 RKhM-4-01 – improved version with more modern equipment, including the GSA-13, IMD-1R, ASP-12 systems, a PGO-11 semi-automatic detection device, R-171M and R-173M radios instead of the older R-123M.
 RKhM-4-02 – with upgraded detection systems such as the ASP-13, IMD-2NM and IMD-23, GSA-14; analysis, storage and interface unit UIK-RKhB and T-235-1U COMSEC equipment.
 RKhM-6 "Povozka" – latest version with state-of-the-art detection systems, including the PRKhDD-2B with a detection range of about 3 km. The RKhM-6 is equipped with an SN-RKhM inertial navigation system and a 14Ts834 satellite navigation system. In service since 2011. Deployed to Syria in November 2018.
 RPM-2 – A mobile radiological reconnaissance station with KRPI system. In service since 2000. Might also be known as NKR (nazemnij kompleks radiatsionnoj razvedki, "ground nuclear recon complex").
 R-149BMRA – command and signals vehicle.
 R-145BM1 – 5th generation command and signals vehicle. Entered service in 2015.
 R-439-BK1 – satellite communications vehicle.

 "BPDM 15TS56M Tajfun-M" – new version for the Strategic Rocket units (RVSN), developed on the basis of the BTR-82 that will replace the base security vehicles MBP on BTR-60/70 chassis. The BTR-80 version is equipped with a new turret with a 7.62 mm machine gun, an unmanned aerial vehicle with a 5 km range, new optical and infrared bands observation device TKN-4S and a "Kredo-1" radar. In service since 2013. Around 70 vehicles were delivered in 2012–2020.
 ZS-88 (zvukoveshchatel’naya stantsiya) – PsyOps vehicle with loudspeaker set.
 ZS-96 (zvukoveshchatel’naya stantsiya) – PsyOps vehicle with loudspeaker set.
 K1Sh1 (GAZ-59032) – command post vehicle with bigger hull and unarmed turret. Also known as UNSh (unifitsirovannyj shassi, "unified chassis"). This version serves as the basis for several specialised vehicles. Estonia used this type as an APC with a machine gun turret.
 BMM-80 "Simfoniya" (GAZ-59039) (bronirovannaya mnogofunktsionalnaya meditsinskaya mashina) – armoured ambulance, comes in three versions each of which can transport 9 patients, including two on stretchers on the rear hull (Developed in 1993):
 BMM-1 (first aid and evacuation from the battle field),
 BMM-2 (initial medical treatment at battalion-level) and
 BMM-3 (mobile field hospital).
 E-351BrM – mobile electric power station. The vehicle is equipped with an AD-30T/400 diesel-electric generator that can deliver power to up to 15 signals vehicles. It has a 2-men crew.
 PU-12M6 (9S482M6) (punkt upravleniya) – battery command vehicle (BKP – batarejnyj kommandnyj punkt) for air defence units equipped with "Strela-1M" (SA-9), "Strela-10M2 (SA-13), "Osa-AK" (SA-8), 2S6 "Tunguska" and ZSU-23-4 "Shilka".
 PU-12M7 (9S482M7) – improved version.
 1V152 – command and forward observer vehicle for field artillery units. The standard equipment consists of range finders, day/night vision devices, navigation equipment etc. The 1V152 and 1V153 (on Ural-4320 truck) belong to the KSAUO "Kapustnik-B" set.
 R-149BMR – signals vehicle, equipped with R-168-100KA "Akveduk-100KA", R-168-100U, R-163-25U, R-163-10V, and R-163-1V "Arbalet" HF/VHF radio sets, AVSK intercom, P-338 video system, AD-3,5U-28,5 generator, ASh-4 telescopic mast, AZI NVIS HF antenna and ShDA-50 Discone-type antenna.
 R-149MA1 – command and signals vehicle.
 R-149MA3 – command and signals vehicle.

 R-165B – HF signals vehicle equipped with "Arbalet-500K", R-163-10V and -50, R-163-AR radios, R-016V "Vishnya" HF link equipment and an AB-4U-P28.5-1V generator. The radio sets have a declared range of 20–350 km on the move and 40–1,000 km deployed.
 R-439-MD2 – satellite communications vehicle.
 R-439-BK "Legenda 2BK" – satellite communications vehicle, operates within 3400-3900 MHz (reception) and 5725-6225 MHz (transmission) ranges.
 P-240BTZ – switchboard vehicle with "Zenit" set. Planned successor for the BTR-60 based P-240BT.

 "Infauna" – An electronic countermeasures variant created for the Airborne Troops. The VDV accepted the first four vehicles into active service in early July 2012 after completing field evaluation which started in early 2012. As of September 2016, it has been delivered to Armenia.
 Mars-2000 – Reconnaissance combat vehicle based on the BTR-82.
 BTR-90

Colombia
  – version for Colombian marines with .50cal machine gun instead of 14.5 mm KPVT. 100 ordered. Caribe project is assembled in COTECMAR (Corporación Tecnológica del Mar Caribe) Plant in Cartagena de Indias, Colombia

Estonia
 BTR-80 UNSh (EST) – Estonian version of the BTR-80. In 1992, about 20 armored vehicles were seized from a company trying to smuggle them out of Estonia as agricultural equipment. These vehicles were put into service in the Estonian Defence Forces. In 2013, 13 vehicles were handed over to the Estonian Defence League.

Hungary
 BTR-80M – Upgraded version with passive day/night sight KM-1M on top of the roof, stowage box for water bottles on the left hull side, improved NBC protection system and Kronsberg radio set.
 BTR-80 GKKO – Turret-less version with observation equipment. Prototype.
 BTR-80 MPAEJ (műszaki páncélozott akadály elháritó jármű) – Unarmed combat engineer version without turret. In service.
 BTR-80 MPFJ (műszaki páncélozott felderitő jármű) – Unarmed obstacle clearing vehicle without turret. In service.
 BTR-80 MVJ (mentő-vontató jármű) – Repair and recovery vehicle with crane and winch. In service.
 BTR-80 SKJ (sebesült kihordó jármű) – Much modified ambulance version with bigger troop compartment.
 BTR-80 VSF (vegyi-sugár felderítő jármű) – NBC reconnaissance vehicle. In service.

North Korea
 M2010 8×8 – Following the acquisition of 32 BTR-80As, North Korea appears to have produced and put into service a domestic clone of the vehicle of an unknown designation. It carries 3 crew and 7–8 troops and is fitted with an indigenous turret equipped with two 14.5 mm and one 7.62 mm machine guns. Other features such as protection, engine placement, entry and exit points, and amphibious capabilities are similar to the BTR-80. It's known unofficially as the M-2010 or Chunma-D, since it first appeared in a military parade in 2010.
 M2010 6×6 – North Korea developed a 6×6 version of the BTR-80A to carry troops and cargo under armor and for reconnaissance. It carries 3 crew and 6 troops and is fitted with the same indigenous turret. There is a door on either side of the hull, and it otherwise has the same protection, engine placement, and amphibious capabilities. It can be fitted with a MANPADS launcher mounted on top of the turret.

Peru
 Lince/Lynx - allegedly a Peruvian upgrade for BTR-80-type APCs by Desarrollos Industriales Casanave, which consist of a better suspension system, engine and gearbox. A 30mm autocannon with FCS controls is installed with two Defender missiles on the cannon.
Nevertheless,  the recognized Ukrainian involvement in the armament (ZTM-2 cannon) and the strong visual resemblance to BTR-3 hints us to state that it is (at least a derivative of) a BTR-3.

Romania
 TAB Zimbru (B33) (transportorul amfibiu blindat) – A modified version of the BTR-80 with Model 1240 V8-DTS engine of 268 hp (197 kW), R-1231B radio set and 500 additional rounds 7.62 mm. Made by CN RomArm SA.
 Zimbru 2000 – An improved version with bigger hull, new Deutz BF6M 1013FC 285 hp (212 kW) engine, new transmission Allison-MD 3060 PR etc. Can be fitted with a new turret like the OWS 25R. Prototype.

Ukraine
 BTR-80UP – An improved version, produced in Ukraine in cooperation with Poland for Iraq (98 planned). Fitted with a new 300 hp engine, additional armour and air conditioner.
 BTR-80UP-KB – battalion level command vehicle.
 BTR-80UP-KR – company level command vehicle.
 BTR-80UP-S – staff vehicle.
 BTR-80UP-M – ambulance.
 BTR-80UP-BREM – recovery vehicle.
 BTR-80UP-R – reconnaissance version.
 BTR-80UP-T – cargo version.
 BTR-94
 KShM "Kushetka-B" – command vehicle, based on the K1Sh1 chassis and developed by Radioprylad from Ukraine. The specialised equipment consists of the "Berkut-M" HF radioset and several, VHF sets – R-171M, R-173M "Abzats-M", R-163-50U, R-163-10V and R-163-1V "Arbalet" (with a range from 5 to 350 km). Other equipment includes a navigation apparatus (probably TNA-4-6), an AB-1-P28,5-B-V1 generator as well as DLYa4.115.002 and DLYa2.091.008 telescopic antenna masts.

Operators

Current operators

 
 : 150
 : 11
 : 160
 : 500
 : 645-1250(sources vary)
 
 : 10
 : 24
 : 8
 : 8
 : 23
 : 555
 
 : 12
 
 : 6
 : 155
 
 : 22
 
 : 20
 
 : 32
 : 1,500 
 : 49
 : 90
 
 
 : 8
 : 32
 : 350, at least 61 BTR-80 were captured during the 2022 Russian invasion of Ukraine.
 : 50
 : 114
 : 100
 : 70

Former operators

 : 13 used by Estonian Defence League. Phased out of active service.
 : 2 bought for testing in 1990. Withdrawn from use in 2010.
 : 180 were bought from ex-GDR and ex-USSR surplus. They were modernized with thermal sight. With the introduction of indigenous and modern vehicles, phased out of active service.
 : passed on to successor peoples.

Potential operators
 : Russia offered the construction of a factory for BTR 80/82 to Argentina.

Museum exhibits
 Parola Tank Museum, Finland

References

Sources
 Zaloga, Steven J. (1990). Soviet Wheeled Armored Vehicles. Hong Kong: Concord Publications. .
 Hull/Markov/Zaloga (1999). Soviet/Russian Armor and Artillery Design Practices: 1945 to Present. Darlington Productions. 
 UN register of conventional arms

External links

 Technical data sheet and pictures BTR-80 ArmyRecognition.com
 Global Security BTR-80 Details
 FAS page
 About BTR-80 series (in Russian)
 Pictures of early BTR-80
 Website of AMZ: BTR-80 (in Russian)
 Walkarounds on BTR-80s, BTR-80As, BTR-80AMs, and on Hungarian modifications
 Weapon Systems BTR-80

 
Armoured personnel carriers of the Soviet Union
Military Industrial Company military vehicles
Amphibious armoured personnel carriers
Wheeled amphibious armoured fighting vehicles
Eight-wheeled vehicles
Military vehicles introduced in the 1980s
Wheeled armoured personnel carriers
Armoured personnel carriers of the Cold War
Armoured personnel carriers of the post–Cold War period